The Airs of Palestine is a poem by John Pierpont (1785–1866), first published in 1816 (Baltimore: B. Edes; various reprints). It is probably the most famous of his poems, and provided the title for his book Airs of Palestine and Other Poems (Boston: Munroe, 1840). 

The poem was a huge success; sale of its copyright funded Pierpont's Harvard Divinity School education and inspired his closest friend and former business partner John Neal to experiment with writing as a means of funding his law education in Baltimore.

Notes

References

 

1816 poems